Nipa Rural LLG is a local-level government (LLG) of Southern Highlands Province, Papua New Guinea.

Wards
01. Soi
02. Nipa H/School
03. Haralinja
04. Almanda 1
05. Almanda 2
06. Sesenda 2
07. Sesenda 1
08. Soi'l 2
09. Shumbi 2
10. Shumbi 1
11. Ebil 2
12. Ebil 1
13. Eganda 3
14. Erepi
15. Ungubi 2
16. Egenda 2
17. Emb
18. Suma 1
19. Suma 2
20. Hepinja 1 & 16
21. Poiya 7
22. Ingin 2
23. Ingin 1
24. Merep
25. Erep 5
26. Tupip
27. Poiya 6
28. Nipa Station
29. Ungubi 1
30. Egenda 1
31. Pulim 3
32. Pulim 2
33. Pulim 1
34. Kware 2
35. Kware 1
36. Komea 2
37. Komea 1
38. Kombela
39. Injip 2
40. Injip 1
41. Puril Mission Station

References

Local-level governments of Southern Highlands Province